The Hill School is a historic school building (now a private residence) at 4 Middle Street in the Padanaram village of Dartmouth, Massachusetts. The two-story wood-frame structure was built c. 1806, and was established by the area's early settlers as a cooperative venture. It has a "3/4" facade, with three asymmetrically placed windows on each floor, and an off-center entry between two of them, with no window above.

The building was listed on the National Register of Historic Places in 1980.

References

School buildings on the National Register of Historic Places in Massachusetts
Dartmouth, Massachusetts
National Register of Historic Places in Bristol County, Massachusetts
Historic district contributing properties in Massachusetts